Witchcraft V: Dance with the Devil is a 1993 American direct-to-video horror film directed by Talun Hsu and starring Marklen Kennedy, Carolyn Taye-Loren, and David Huffman. The fifth film in the Witchcraft series, followed by Witchcraft VI: The Devil's Mistress. It was produced by Vista Street Entertainment and released by Troma Studios.

Plot

Marta (Nicole Sassaman) and her boyfriend  Bill (Freddy Andreiuci), run a scam were Marta lures an unsuspecting "date" back to her motel room where Bill then knocks the date out and they loot the victim. This time, however, the caper goes awry, and the victim was killed. Upset at the circumstances, and with the body in the trunk, Bill hits a homeless person and almost gets into a wreck with televangelist Reverend Meredith (Lenny Rose).

While the Reverend tries to help the homeless man, a mystic forces goes from the homeless man into the preacher, altering the preacher, who now shows much more interest in his secretary (Kim Bolin).

Marta and Bill bury the dead victim in the countryside, and with their car now inoperable, stumble into the campsite of Cain (David Huffman), who calls himself collector. After trying to run their scam on Cain, Cain turns the tables on them and uses his mystic sword to control Marta, ordering her to kill Bill, with which she complies. Cain reveals himself to be the agent of Satan.

Warlock/attorney hero William Spanner from Witchcraft 2-4 (Marklen Kennedy) and his girlfriend Keli (Carolyn Taye-Loren) are out on a date when Keli is hypnotized by the club's DJ, who is Cain. Cain sensing Spanner's power, tricks him to go onstage and implants a post hypnotic suggestion in Spanner. Cain wants to use spanner's powers to speed up his plan to bring Satan to Earth.

With Spanner acting very out of character, Keli contacts Reverend Meredith, who immediately brings in white witch Anastasia (Aysha Hauer). Anastasia casts a spell of protection on Spanner, but Marta, who has been nightly seducing and ravishing William, kills Anastasia.

Keli goes searching for William at Cain's club and is attacked by Marta. Cain is about to sacrifice her when William appears, bearing Reverend Meredith. William fights off Cain's influence and engages the villain in a duel. In the process, both Cain and Marta are killed, and William and Keli are reunited.

Cast
 Marta Nicole Sassaman as Marta
 Bill Freddy Andreiuci as Bill
 Lenny Rose as Reverend Meredith
 David Huffman as Cain
 Marklen Kennedy as William Spanner
 Carolyn Taye-Loren as Keli
 Aysha Hauer as Astasia

Continuity

William Spanner's role is greatly reduced from the previous three movies from hero to victim. Footage of the witch burning from the first movie is used.

Reception

1000 misspent hours notes that while noting the movie veers close to soft-core porn, notes the story is better than the previous two movies. AV club found the movie very over-the-top, and states that Huffman’s campy performance makes this one a hoot  TV Guide finds the film a reflection of the series as a whole with low production values, poor scripting, uninspired direction and an ever-increasing reliance on bared breasts to arouse the audience.

References

1993 films
1990s English-language films
Films about witchcraft
American supernatural horror films
1990s supernatural horror films
American sequel films
1990s American films